Smoking Kills is the debut album of The Disciplines, released in 2009.

Track listing

References

External links

2009 debut albums
The Disciplines albums